Procraerus is a genus of beetles belonging to the family Elateridae.

Species:
 Procraerus agriotides Schimmel, 2003
 Procraerus angustus Schimmel, 2003
 Procraerus assamensis Schimmel, 2003

References

Elateridae
Elateridae genera